Lebach is a town in the district of Saarlouis, in Saarland, Germany. As of 2020, its population was 18,828.

Inhabitants

(31 December)

Mayors
 1978–2006: Nikolaus Jung, CDU (died 2013)
 2006–2012: Arno Schmidt, CDU (died 2012)
 since 2013: Klauspeter Brill, independent

On January 22, 2006 Arno Schmidt (CDU) won the election against Jürgen Barke (SPD). Arno Schmidt died in 2012 at the age of 60. Klauspeter Brill was elected as mayor on May 26, 2013.

Education

Daycare centers 
 Day care center Aschbach
 Daycare Dörsdorf
 Daycare Lebach
 Daycare Steinbach
 Daycare Thalexweiler
 Kindergarten Herz-Jesu Gresaubach
 Cath. Kindergarten St. Donatus, Landsweiler
 Cath. Kindergarten Hl. Dreifaltigkeit and St. Marien, Lebach
 Day care center "St. Nikolaus", Lebach

Elementary schools 
 Elementary school Landsweiler
 Elementary school Lebach
 Elementary school Steinbach
 Nikolaus-Groß-School Lebach

High schools 
 Geschwister-Scholl High School Lebach
 Johannes-Kepler High School Lebach

Community schools 
 Theeltalschule Lebach
 Nikolaus-Groß-Schule Lebach

Vocational school 
 BBZ Lebach

Notable people
 Nadine Schön (born 1983), politician (CDU)

Personalities who work, worked or died in the town
 Günther Kastenfrosch (born 1872), international celebrity, lives under the Breeck
 Klaus Steinbach (born 1953), swimming sportsman, lives in Lebach

See also
 Thalexweiler

References

External links
 Official homepage

Saarlouis (district)
Duchy of Lorraine